Tyler Slavin (born January 29, 1992) is a former American football wide receiver. He played college football at Arizona and New Mexico Highlands.

Early years
Slavin attended Eleanor Roosevelt High School in Eastvale, California, where he graduated in 2010.

College career

Arizona Wildcats
Slavin committed to play for Arizona on December 7, 2009 and enrolled on June 30, 2010. Slavin redshirted for his freshman season with the  Wildcats. Over the next two seasons Slavin appeared in 18 games as a reserve receiver for the Wildcats making 22 receptions for 224 yards and a touchdown. In late June 2013 Slavin left the Arizona Wildcats' football program and transferred to New Mexico Highlands, a Division II football program.

New Mexico Highlands Cowboys
Slavin sat out his first season at New Mexico Highlands. In the second season with Cowboys, Slavin had games with 17 receipts for 225 yards and four touchdowns as well as an outing with 14 receipts for 278 yards and two touchdowns. At the end of the season Slavin was honored with the RMAC Offensive Player of the Year award and was named first-team all-conference after making 119 receptions for 1,418 yards and 17 touchdowns.

Professional career

St. Louis Rams
On May 2, 2015, after going undrafted, the St. Louis Rams signed Slavin as an undrafted free agent. On August 31, 2015, Slavin was released as part of the team's roster cuts down to 75 players.

Seattle Seahawks
On November 24, 2015, the Seattle Seahawks signed Slavin to their practice squad. On December 1, 2015, the Seahawks released Slavin from their practice squad. On February 4, 2016, Slavin signed a futures contract with the Seahawks. On May 4, 2016, the Seahawks waived Slavin. He resigned with the Seahawks on May 9, 2016 after participating in the Seahawks' Mini Camp. On July 31, 2016, the Seahawks placed Slavin on the injured reserve list.

References

External links
Seattle Seahawks bio
New Mexico Highlands Cowboys bio
Arizona Wildcats bio

1992 births
Living people
American football wide receivers
St. Louis Rams players
Seattle Seahawks players
Sportspeople from Corona, California
Players of American football from California
People from Eastvale, California